Kuklice  is a village in the administrative district of Gmina Kobierzyce, within Wrocław County, Lower Silesian Voivodeship, in south-western Poland.

The name of the village is of Polish origin and comes from the word kukułka, which means "cuckoo".

References

Kuklice